Harpalus mauritanicus is a species of ground beetle in the subfamily Harpalinae. It was described by Gaubil in 1844.

References

mauritanicus
Beetles described in 1844